In enzymology, a chlorogenate-glucarate O-hydroxycinnamoyltransferase is an enzyme that catalyzes the chemical reaction

chlorogenate + glucarate  quinate + 2-O-caffeoylglucarate

Thus, the two substrates of this enzyme are chlorogenate and glucarate, whereas its two products are quinate and 2-O-caffeoylglucarate.

This enzyme belongs to the family of transferases, specifically those acyltransferases transferring groups other than aminoacyl groups.  The systematic name of this enzyme class is chlorogenate:glucarate O-(hydroxycinnamoyl)transferase. Other names in common use include chlorogenate:glucarate caffeoyltransferase, chlorogenic acid:glucaric acid O-caffeoyltransferase, and chlorogenate:glucarate caffeoyltransferase.

References

 
 

EC 2.3.1
Enzymes of unknown structure